In geology, the term glomeroporphyritic (also cumulophyritic) refers to the grouping of phenocrysts, not necessarily of the same mineral, into distinct clusters within porphyritic igneous rocks.

References

Igneous petrology